Jane Currie Blaikie "A. K." Hoge (July 31, 1811 – August 26, 1890) was a welfare worker, fund raiser, and nurse during the American Civil War. She was a founder of a homeless shelter in Chicago before the war. After the war, she raised funds, helped organize and served on the board of trustees of the Evanston College for Ladies. She served as head of the Woman's Presbyterian Board of Missions of the Northwest for thirteen years.

Early life 

Hoge born in Philadelphia, Pennsylvania on July 31, 1811, to George Dundas Blaikie and Mary Monroe. She was educated at the Young Ladies College in Philadelphia. She married Abraham Holmes Hoge on June 2, 1831. They had thirteen children. Eight lived to maturity. She moved from Pittsburgh to Chicago in 1848.

Social work career 
Hoge was a founder of the Chicago Home for the Friendless in 1858. She was active in recruiting nurses for the Union army during the Civil War and would recount her experiences in her 1867 memoir The Boys in Blue. Hoge co-administered the Chicago Sanitary Commission (1862–1865) with Mary Livermore. The volunteer organization raised funds and collected and distributed medical supplies and food to soldiers of the Union Army.

In 1871, she organized the fund raising for the Evanston Illinois College for Ladies, which opened in that year. She served on the college's board until it merged with Northwestern University in 1874. She was head of the Woman's Presbyterian Board of Foreign Missions in the Northwest from 1872 to 1885.

Death and legacy 
Jane Currie Blaikie Hoge died in Chicago, Illinois, on August 26, 1890, aged 79.

Notes

References 
Engle, Nancy Driscol. (Bernard A.Cook, Ed.) "Jane Currie Blaiklie. Women and War: A Historical Encyclopedia from Antiquity to the Present. (p. 289) Santa Barbara, Calif: ABC-CLIO, 2006.Google Books Retrieved February 19, 2009.
Phelps, Dorsey (2002-01-01). "Hoge, Jane (1811–1890)". Women in World History: A biographical encyclopedia. Retrieved 2012-09-07

External links
Women in American History - Jane Currie Blaikie Hoge
The Boys in Blue text from googlebooks

1811 births
1890 deaths
People of Illinois in the American Civil War
People from Philadelphia
American Civil War nurses
American women nurses